Yukarıbeltarla is a village in the Başmakçı District, Afyonkarahisar Province, Turkey. Its population is 442 (2021). It lies just to the northeast of Ovacık.

References

Villages in Başmakçı District